Augustine Warner, Sr. (September 28th 1611 – December 24th,  1674),  was an English planter and politician. The progenitor of a prominent colonial family, and great-great grandfather of President George Washington, he was born in Norwich, Norfolk, the son of Thomas Warner and Elizabeth Sotherton. Augustine arrived in Virginia in 1628 at the age of seventeen, one of a group of thirty-four settlers brought in by Adam Thoroughgood.  His first land acquisition came seven years later, when he patented .

Continuing the typical pattern of 17th-century success in colonial Virginia as a merchant, landowner, and politician, he rose through the hierarchy to become a member of the House of Burgesses in 1652 and then in 1659 a member of the King's Council, which he held until his death. About 1657, he moved across the York River to Gloucester County, where he settled and built the first house at Warner Hall.

Augustine Warner died in 1674, at sixty-three, and was succeeded at Warner Hall by his only son, Augustine Warner, Jr. (1642–1681).  After his English education in London and at Cambridge, the younger Warner returned to Virginia, and by 1666 became a member of the House of Burgesses, and then Speaker of the House in 1676. In 1677 he took his seat on the King's Council, but his career was cut short by his early death in 1681 at the age of thirty-nine.

Descendants
Besides a son, Augustine Sr. had two known daughters.  One married David Cant, the other, Sarah, to Lawrence Towneley, an ancestor of General Robert E. Lee.

It is recorded that Augustine Jr. had three sons, all of whom died unmarried, and three daughters, who inherited the Warner property and left many descendants:

 Mary, who married in 1680 John Smith of Purton; they were ancestors of Queen Elizabeth II of the United Kingdom.
 Mildred, who married about 1690 Lawrence Washington (1659–1698); they were the paternal grandparents of George Washington; and
 Elizabeth, who married about 1691 to John Lewis, and kept the Warner Hall house in the division of the Warner properties after the brothers’ deaths.  Elizabeth and John Lewis were the grandparents of Fielding Lewis, who married first George Washington’s cousin, and second his sister, both ladies also being grandchildren of Mildred Warner. In addition, Elizabeth and John Lewis were the ancestors of Captain Meriwether Lewis of the Lewis and Clark Expedition.
 
Warner Hall stayed in the eldest male line of the Lewis family, through a succession  named Warner Lewis, until 1834, when it was sold by a daughter of the last, Elizabeth Lewis. The Lewis descendants became known as the "Warner Hall Lewises".

References

Bibliography
 Sorley, Merrow Egerton  Lewis of Warner Hall: The History of a Family, Including the Genealogy of Descendants in Both the Male and Female Lines, Biographical Sketches of Its Members, and Their Descent from Other Early Virginia Families
 Moses, Grace MacClean.  The Welsh Lineage of John Lewis.
 The Queen's American Ancestors

Virginia colonial people
Genetic genealogy
Augustine Sr.
English emigrants
Politicians from Norwich
1611 births
1674 deaths